Will O'Neill (born October 21, 1983) is the former Mayor of the City of Newport Beach and Chair of the San Joaquin Hills Transportation Corridor Agency.

Life and career
He grew up in the Central Valley community of Fresno. He graduated from Stanford University (B.A. History) where he lettered on the track and field team. He then graduated from U.C. Hastings College of the Law (J.D.). He has served on the U.C. Hastings Board of Governors, most recently as President during the 2016/2017 term.

He is a partner with the law firm of Ross, Wersching & Wolcott, LLP. He previously worked for California Supreme Court Justice Marvin Baxter (Ret.), the California Court of Appeal (Fifth Appellate District), and Dallas-based firm Haynes & Boone, LLP.

He is the Chair of the Newport Beach Finance Committee.  While on the Finance Committee, he helped lead the effort to restructure Newport Beach's unfunded pension liability payments to save the city an estimated $45 Million.

He helped reform Newport Beach's civil asset forfeiture policy.  He also led the effort in Newport Beach to prohibit using public money for tax increase education efforts.

As Mayor, he called 2020 "The Year Of The Volunteer." His intention was to celebrate volunteers and community members and groups that give their time and talents for the betterment of the city.

On January 26, 2020, nine people (mostly from Newport Beach) died in a helicopter crash, including Kobe Bryant.  O'Neill visited an impromptu candlelight vigil where he said: “There were seven lights that were burning bright this morning in Newport Beach and they got snuffed out. When we lose fathers and mothers and daughters and sons and those lights go out, we come together as a community. That’s who we are.”

During the COVID-19 pandemic, he was Mayor when Governor Gavin Newsom shut down Orange County's beaches.  Mayor O'Neill appeared on The Tucker Carlson Show to denounce the closures as politically motivated rather than science-based. He also appeared on a Fox11 Special Report with Elex Michaelson and Dr. Drew Pinsky.  Newport Beach's beaches were reopened shortly after.

Mayor O'Neill was re-elected to the Newport Beach City Council on November 3, 2020.  He ran unopposed.

In 2022, O'Neill was unanimously elected as the Chair of the San Joaquin Hills Transportation Corridor Agency (SJHTCA). The SJHTCA oversees the 73 Toll Road and includes member agencies Aliso Viejo, Costa Mesa, Dana Point, Irvine, Laguna Hills, Laguna Niguel, Laguna Woods, Mission Viejo, Newport Beach, San Juan Capistrano, Santa Ana and the County of Orange.  When the SJHTCA approved an ~$134 million budget for 22/23, O'Neill was quoted saying: “The Agencies have a proven record of creating reliable infrastructure and ensuring our roads support the movement of people and goods through strong fiscal stewardship. The adoption of the budgets continues that stewardship and will allow us to continue providing transportation solutions in our region.”

References

External links 

 Newport Beach City Council Site

1983 births
Living people
Politicians from Greater Los Angeles
Government in Orange County, California
People from Newport Beach, California